Provincial Trunk Highway 20A (PTH 20A) is a  long provincial highway spur in the Canadian province of Manitoba. Its main purpose is to provide access to Dauphin for any traffic using PTH 20. 

Unlike most alternate highways, which would have been the original route of the main highway before it was realigned and redesignated, the southern leg of PTH 20A (1st Avenue N.E.) was the original route of PTH 5 before its current section between Ochre River and PTH 10 south was constructed and opened to traffic in 1959. Prior to the realignment of PTH 5, PTH 20's southern terminus was just east of Dauphin. Although it acts as the eastern boundary for its city limits, PTH 20 never enters Dauphin itself.

Route Description
From its southern terminus with PTH 20, PTH 20A travels  into Dauphin's city center along 1st Avenue N.E. where it meets the alternate routes of both PTH 5 and PTH 10 in Dauphin's city center. PTH 20A comes into the concurrency for about  before PTH 5A/10A turns left on to 2nd Avenue N.W. From this point, it travels northeast along Main Street N. and River Avenue E. for  back to its northern terminus with PTH 20.

References

020A
Dauphin, Manitoba